Herman Bing (March 30, 1889 – January 9, 1947) was a German-American character actor. He acted in more than 120 films and many of his parts were uncredited.

Biography

Bing was born in Frankfurt am Main, Germany.   He was son of the opera singer Max Bing (1865-1919) and Frieda Seckback (1869-1939), and brother of actor Gustav Bing (1893-1967), Clara Bing (1895-1976), and Erna Bing Swarzchild. He was married to Carla Lichtenstein and had one daughter.

Bing began his career at the circus, at age 16, and vaudeville showing comedic talent.
In 1921 he made his film debut in "Ciska Barna, die Zigeunerin".

He was production chief of several films in Germany before he went to America, in 1923, with director Friedrich Wilhelm Murnau as Murnau's interpreter and assistant director. He also worked under John Ford and Frank Borzage, before establishing himself as a successful character actor well known for his wild-eyed facial expressions and thick German accent.

He provided the voice for the Ringmaster in Walt Disney's Dumbo (1941).  The start of World War II in Europe caused all things German to be unpopular with audiences. His German accent was no longer in demand in the years following World War II. He became increasingly depressed in the mid-1940s, as he was unable to secure work in Hollywood, and committed suicide by gunshot in 1947.

Selected filmography

 Ciska Barna, Die Zigeunerin (1921)
 4 Devils (1928)
 Married in Hollywood (1929) as German Director
 A Song of Kentucky (1929) as Jake Kleinschmidt
 The Three Sisters (1930) as Von kosch
 Show Girl in Hollywood (1930) as Mr. Bing – Otis' Assistant
 Men Behind Bars (1931) as Lawyer
 Women Love Once (1931)
 The Great Lover (1931) as Losseck
 The Guardsman (1931) as A Creditor
 Westward Passage (1932) as Otto Hoopengarner – the Dutchman
 Flesh (1932) as Pepi – Headwaiter
 Hypnotized (1932) as Capt. Otto Von Stormberg
 The Plumber and the Lady (1933 short) as Otto Mauser
 The Nuisance (1933) as Willy
 Dinner at Eight (1933) as Waiter
 My Lips Betray (1933) as Weininger
 Footlight Parade (1933) as Fralick
 The Bowery (1933) as Max Herman
 Fits in a Fiddle (1933 short) as Heinrich Mickelmeier
 College Coach (1933) as Prof. Glantz
 Trimmed in Furs (1934 short) as Engles the Lodge Owner
 Mandalay (1934) as Prof. Kleinschmidt
 Melody in Spring (1934) as Wirt
 I'll Tell the World (1934) as Adolph
 Manhattan Love Song (1934) as Gustave
 Hide-Out (1934) as Jake
 Embarrassing Moments (1934) as Bartender
 When Strangers Meet (1934) as Mr. Oscar Schultz
 The Merry Widow (1934) as Zizipoff
 Crimson Romance (1934) as Himmelbaum
 Love Time (1934) as Istvan
 The Mighty Barnum (1934) as Farmer Schultz
 The Night Is Young (1935) as Nepomuk
 The Great Hotel Murder (1935) as Hans
 The Florentine Dagger (1935) as Baker
 The Misses Stooge (1935 short) as Sazarac the Magician
 In Caliente (1935) as Florist
 Stage Frights (1935 short)
 Calm Yourself (1935) as Mr. Sam Bromberg
 Don't Bet on Blondes (1935) as Prof. Friedrich Wilhelm Gruber
 Every Night at Eight (1935) as Joe Schmidt
 Call of the Wild (1935) as Sam
 Redheads on Parade (1935) as Lionel Kunkel
 His Family Tree (1935) as Mr. 'Stony' Stonehill
 Three Kids and a Queen (1935) as Walter Merkin
 1000 Dollars a Minute (1935) as Vanderbrocken
 Fighting Youth (1935) as Luigi
 Rose Marie (1936) as Mr. Daniells
 Slide, Nellie, Slide (1936 short) as The Hot Dog King
 Tango (1936) as Mr. Kluckmeyer – Tango Hosiery
 Laughing Irish Eyes (1936) as Weisbecher
 The Great Ziegfeld (1936) as Costumer
 The King Steps Out (1936) as Pretzelberger
 The Three Wise Guys (1936) as Baumgarten
 Human Cargo (1936) as Fritz Schultz
 Blackmailer (1936) as Dr. Rosenkrantz – Coroner
 Adventure in Manhattan (1936) as Otto
 Come Closer, Folks (1936) as Herman
 That Girl from Paris (1936) as 'Hammy' Hammacher
 Champagne Waltz (1937) as Max Snellinek
 Maytime (1937) as August Archipenko
 Oh, What a Knight! (1937 short)
 Beg, Borrow or Steal (1937) as Von Giersdorff – aka Count Herman
 Every Day's a Holiday (1937) as Fritz Krausmeyer
 Paradise for Three (1938) as Mr. Polter
 Bluebeard's Eighth Wife (1938) as Monsieur Pepinard
 Four's a Crowd (1938) as Barber
 Vacation from Love (1938) as Oscar Wittlesbach
 The Great Waltz (1938) as Dommayer
 Sweethearts (1938) as Oscar Engel
 Bitter Sweet (1940) as Market Keeper
 Dumbo (1941) as The Ringmaster (voice, uncredited)
 The Devil with Hitler (1942 short) as Louis
 The Captain from Köpenick (completed in 1941, released in 1945) as City Hall guardian Kilian
 Where Do We Go from Here? (1945) as Hessian Col. / Von Heisel
 Rendezvous 24 (1946) as Herr Schmidt
 Night and Day (1946) as Ladisaus Smedick – 2nd 'Peaches' (uncredited) (final film role)

References

External links
 
 Portrait of the Actor Herman Bing by Thomas Staedeli
 
 Columbia Shorts Dept- Herman Bing

1889 births
1947 deaths
German emigrants to the United States
Burials at Hollywood Forever Cemetery
German male film actors
German male voice actors
Actors from Frankfurt
People from Hesse-Nassau
Suicides by firearm in California
20th-century German male actors
1947 suicides